The Republic of Marshall Islands has two museums:

 Alele Museum & Public Library
 Marshallese Cultural Center

 
Marshall Islands
Museums
Marshall Islands

Museums